Nishedhi is a 1984 Indian Malayalam-language film, directed by K. S. Gopalakrishnan. The film stars Sukumaran, Bheeman Raghu and Seema in the lead roles. The film has musical score by K. J. Joy.

Cast
Sukumaran as Raju
Bheeman Raghu as Vimal/Vinod
Seema as  Sheeja
 Vincent Karunakara Kurup
 Sudheer as  Williams
 Ravi Menon  as Ravi
 Santhosh  as Sunny
 Khadeeja  as Mariyamma
 Anuradha
 M. G. Soman  as Rajasekharan
 Ranipadmini  as Ajitha
 Kalaranjini  as Anitha
 K. P. Ummer as  Madhavan Thampi
 Poojappura Ravi as Narayana Pilla
 Santhakumari
 Mafia Sasi

Soundtrack
The music was composed by K. J. Joy and the lyrics were written by Bharanikkavu Sivakumar.

References

External links
 

1984 films
1980s Malayalam-language films